CIAA, the International Conference on Implementation and Application of Automata is an annual academic conference in the field of computer science. 
Its purpose is to bring together members of the academic, research, and industrial community who have an interest in the theory, implementation, and application of automata and related structures. There, the conference concerns research on all aspects of implementation and application of automata and related structures, including theoretical aspects. In 2000, the conference grew out of the Workshop on Implementation of Automata (WIA).

Like most theoretical computer science conferences its contributions are strongly peer-reviewed; the articles appear in proceedings published in Springer Lecture Notes in Computer Science. Extended versions of selected papers of each year's conference alternatingly appear in the journals Theoretical Computer Science and International Journal of Foundations of Computer Science. Every year a best paper award is presented.

Topics of the Conference 
Since the focus of the conference is on applied theory, 
contributions usually come from a widespread range of application domains.  
Typical topics of the conference include, among others, the following, 
as they relate to automata:

 Bio-inspired computing
 Complexity of automata operations, state complexity
 Compilers
 Computer-aided verification, model checking
 Concurrency
 Data and image compression
 Design and architecture of automata software
 Document engineering
 Natural language processing
 Pattern matching
 Teaching of automata theory
 Text processing
 Techniques for graphical display of automata

History of the Conference 

The CIAA conference series was founded by Darrell Raymond and Derick Wood.
Since 2013, the Steering committee is chaired by Kai Salomaa.

See also 
List of computer science conferences contains other academic conferences in computer science

References 
.

External links 
 official website of CIAA
 CIAA proceedings information from DBLP

Theoretical computer science conferences
Automata (computation)
Formal languages